The term Ibero-Caucasian (or Iberian-Caucasian) was proposed by Georgian linguist Arnold Chikobava for the union of the three language families that are specific to the Caucasus, namely

 South Caucasian, also called Kartvelian.
 Northwest Caucasian, also called Abkhazo-Adyghean.
 Northeast Caucasian, also called Nakho–Dagestanian.

The Ibero-Caucasian phylum would also include three extinct languages: Hattic, connected by some linguists to the Northwest (Circassian) family, and Hurrian and Urartian, connected to the Northeast (Nakh–Dagestanian) family.

Family status 
The affinities between the three families are disputed.  A connection between the Northeast and Northwest families is seen as likely by many linguists; see the article on the North Caucasian languages for details.

On the other hand, there are no known affinities between South Caucasian and the northern languages, which are two unrelated phyla even in Greenberg's deep classification of the world's languages.  "Ibero-Caucasian" therefore remains at best a convenient geographical designation.

Family name 
The "Iberian" in the family name refers to Caucasian Iberia — a kingdom centered in Eastern Georgia which lasted from the 4th century BC to the 5th century AD, and is not related to the Iberian Peninsula.

See also
 Languages of the Caucasus

Main research centers
 TSU Institute of caucasiology
 Chikobava Institute of Linguistics of the Georgian Academy of Sciences (Tbilisi).
 Department of Caucasiology at the University of Jena (Germany).
 Faculty of Philology at the  Tbilisi State University (Tbilisi).

Main publications

 The Yearbook of the Iberian-Caucasian Linguistics (Tbilisi).
 Revue de Kartvelologie et Caucasologie (Paris).

Bibliography 

Tuite, Kevin (2008): "The Rise and Fall and Revival of the Ibero-Caucasian Hypothesis", Historiographia Linguistica Vol. 35, No. 1-2., pp. 23–82.

Proposed language families
Languages of the Caucasus